Andreas Sjalg Unneland (born 30 June 1994) is a Norwegian politician. He is member of the Storting from 2021, representing the Socialist Left Party, elected from the constituency of Oslo.

Political career
Unneland was deputy representative to the Storting for the period 2017–2021, from the constituency of Hordaland. He chaired Socialist Youth from 2018 to 2020. He was elected representative to the Storting from the constituency of Oslo for the period 2021–2025, for the Socialist Left Party.

Personal life
Unneland was born on 30 June 1994. He studied jurisprudence at the University of Bergen.

References

1994 births
Living people
University of Bergen alumni
Socialist Left Party (Norway) politicians
Members of the Storting